Don't Overlook Salvation is an album of gospel music by American country music singer Ricky Van Shelton. No singles were released from this album. Despite its lack of singles, the album was certified gold by the RIAA. On the inside of the cover is a painting by Ricky of Jesus rescuing a lamb.

Track listing
"Don't Overlook Salvation" (John Bava) - 3:20
"To My Mansion in the Sky" (Jimmie Davis) - 2:42
"Family Bible" (Walt Breeland, Paul Buskirk, Claude Gray) - 3:24
"Holy (I Bowed on My Knees and Cried Holy)" (Davis) - 2:58
"Suppertime" (Ira Stanphill) - 4:48
"I Shall Not Be Moved" (arr. by Ricky Van Shelton) - 2:15
"Mansion Over the Hilltop" (Stanphill) - 3:06
"The Old Rugged Cross" (Traditional) - 5:29
"I Would Take Nothing for My Journey Now" (Davis, Charles Goodman) - 2:03
"I Saw a Man" (Arthur "Guitar Boogie" Smith) - 3:14
"Just as I Am/He Smiled as He Ran Out to Play" (Arr. by Ricky Van Shelton) - 2:49

Personnel
As listed in liner notes
Main Musicians
 Victor Battista - upright bass
 Eddie Bayers - percussion
 Mark Casstevens - acoustic guitar, banjo
 Steve Gibson - electric guitar, mandolin
 Rob Hajacos - fiddle
 Roy Huskey, Jr. - upright bass
 Randy McCormick - piano, organ
 Farrell Morris - percussion
 Mark O'Connor - fiddle, mandolin
 Tom Robb - bass guitar
 Ricky Van Shelton - lead vocals
Background vocals by The Cumberland Boys.
Additional background vocals on "The Old Rugged Cross" by Vicki Hampton and Donna McElroy.

Strings
Arranged by Kristin Wilkinson
Grace Mihi Bahng - cello
David Davidson - violin
Christian Teal - violin
Kristin Wilkinson - viola

References

1992 albums
Ricky Van Shelton albums
Albums produced by Steve Buckingham (record producer)
Columbia Records albums
Gospel albums by American artists